Grace Kubi Daniel (born 24 February 1984) is a Nigerian badminton player. She defeated South Africa's Michelle Claire Edwards for the gold medal in the women's singles, and also, teamed up with Susan Ideh for a silver in the doubles at the 2007 All-Africa Games in Algiers, Algeria.

Daniel qualified for the women's singles at the 2008 Summer Olympics in Beijing, after she was ranked eighty-ninth in the world, and awarded a continental spot for Africa by the Badminton World Federation. She lost the first preliminary round match to Czech Republic's Kristina Ludíková, with a score of 13–21 and 8–21.

Achievements

African Games 
Women's singles

Women's doubles

Mixed doubles

African Championships 
Women's singles

Women's doubles

Mixed Doubles

BWF International Challenge/Series
Women's singles

Women's doubles

Mixed doubles

 BWF International Challenge tournament
 BWF International Series tournament
 BWF Future Series tournament

References

External links
 
 
 
 
 
 NBC Olympics profile

1984 births
Living people
Nigerian female badminton players
Badminton players at the 2008 Summer Olympics
Olympic badminton players of Nigeria
Badminton players at the 2002 Commonwealth Games
Commonwealth Games competitors for Nigeria
Competitors at the 2003 All-Africa Games
Competitors at the 2007 All-Africa Games
Competitors at the 2011 All-Africa Games
African Games gold medalists for Nigeria
African Games silver medalists for Nigeria
African Games bronze medalists for Nigeria
African Games medalists in badminton
21st-century Nigerian women